Mohd Iznan "Pekin" Ibrahim (born 25 October 1981) is a Malaysian actor. He is best known for his roles in the critically acclaimed film Bunohan (2012), Hantu Kak Limah Balik Rumah (2010),  Apokalips X, Ophilia (both in 2014), Munafik and Mat Moto (both in 2016); the last film won him the Malaysia Film Festival award for the Best Actor category, beating other nominees like Shaheizy Sam, Zizan Razak, and Aaron Aziz.

Early life 
The youngest child from six siblings, Pekin was born on 25 October 1981 in Kota Bharu, Kelantan to  parents Che Jah Che Mat and Ibrahim Awang. His father died of a heart attack when he was 11. His first job was as a worker at an A&W restaurant in Subang Jaya after he left his hometown with his best friend, Danny Anwa from Malaysian boy band, X-Factor at the age of 16 to start a new life in Kuala Lumpur. While he was working at the restaurant, he attended several auditions for roles in dramas and movies. He also worked very hard to master English and hide his thick Kelantanese accent.

Career 
Pekin started his career as a supporting actor, his first movie being Di Ambang Misteri directed by Silver Chung in 2004 and then Cinta Terakhir directed by Along Kamaludin. In 2009, he was offered to play a supporting role in a horror film called Skrip 7707 directed by Abdul Razak Mohaideen.

Pekin rose to fame as he joined the cast of the horror comedy film Hantu Kak Limah Balik Rumah (2010) directed by Mamat Khalid. In 2012, he played Bakar in Bunohan directed by Dain Iskandar Said. His Kelantanese origins were a convenience to his character who is supposed to speak in the dialect of the state Bunohan was set in.

In 2013, he had been offered once again by Mamat Khalid to play a role as a main actor in his new comedy film called Rock Ooo and then later Apokalips X. He then played a big part in the thriller film Ophilia (2014) directed by Raja Mukhriz Raja Ahmad Kamaluddin as one of the members in a skinhead group.

In 2015, he played a role as a main character in Villa Nabila, a horror movie directed by Syafiq Yusof. In 2016, Pekin was offered by Syamsul Yusof to play a role in Munafik as a main actor. The movie managed to earn about RM 19 million (RM17 million domestic plus RM2 million in neighbouring countries) in just 2 months. In 2016, Pekin ventured into film directing career with films Mat Moto and Volkswagen Kuning, the former winning him three awards at 28th Malaysia Film Festival including Best Original Story, Best New Actress for Falisha Crossley, and Best Actor via Pekin himself. After his win in the 2016 Malaysia Film Festival, he said:

Personal life
Pekin married actress Mona Allen on 7 December 2018.

On 31 August 2022, they welcomed their first child, a son named Petra Pekin.

Filmography

Film

Television series

Theater

Telemovie

Discography

Awards and nominations

References

External links 

 
  
 
 

1981 births
Living people
People from Kota Bharu
People from Kelantan
Malaysian people of Malay descent
Malaysian Muslims
Malaysian male actors
Malaysian film directors
Malaysian male film actors
Malaysian producers
21st-century Malaysian male actors